HMS Ajax was the name ship of her class of ironclad battleships built for the Royal Navy during the 1870s. Completed in 1883, she was immediately placed in reserve until 1885 when the ship was commissioned for the first time. Later that year, Ajax was assigned as a coast guard ship in Scotland and remained there for the next six years. She was reduced to reserve again in 1891 and was taken out of service a decade later. The ship was sold for scrap in 1904 and subsequently broken up.

Design and description
The Ajax class was designed as a shallow-draught version of the preceding  that was also smaller and cheaper; unfortunately the need, imposed by budgetary constraints, to produce a smaller ship produced a vessel with all of the shortcomings of Inflexible but with none of her virtues. Their crew consisted of 345 officers and ratings, over  less than Inflexible. The Ajax-class ships were bad seaboats and steered very erratically, especially at high speed. More deadwood was added to their sterns in 1886 in a partially successful attempt to rectify the problem.

The Ajax class was powered by a pair of inverted, vertical, compound-expansion steam engines. These were built by John Penn and Sons and each drove a single propeller using steam provided by 10 cylindrical boilers.

They copied the main armament layout of Inflexible with their turrets arranged en echelon so that both turrets could fire directly ahead and to each side, although this was more theoretical than practical due to damage from muzzle blast. Each turret mounted a pair of rifled muzzle-loading RML  guns. To attack the unarmoured portion of their opponents, the Ajax class was fitted with a pair of rifled breech-loading BL , 80-pounder guns. For defence against torpedo boats, they carried six quick-firing QF 6-pdr  Nordenfelt guns. The ships also mounted a pair of above-water  torpedo launchers and could carry a  torpedo boat.

The Ajax class copied Inflexibles armour scheme of a heavily armoured citadel with unamoured ends and sides, but unlike their predecessor, they lacked enough buoyancy to remain afloat if their ends were flooded.

Construction and career
Ajax, the fourth ship of her name to serve in the Royal Navy, was named for the mythological hero. The ship was laid down on 21 March 1876 in No. 4 Slipway, Pembroke Dockyard, Wales, and was launched on 10 March 1880 by Mrs. George Parkin, wife of the dockyard's Captain-Superintendent. She was completed on 30 March 1883 at a cost of £548,393.

Ajax was not commissioned until 30 April 1885 and was assigned to the Particular Service Squadron commanded by Admiral Geoffrey Hornby. That summer, the squadron evaluated the weapons and defences of a fortified harbour, Berehaven (now Castletownbere), Ireland, against torpedo boats and other threats. In August 1885, when tensions with Russia had subsided, she was posted as guard ship at Greenock. Ajax accidentally collided with the turret ship  in 1887 off Portland. The latter had one compartment below water holed, but Ajax only received two holes in her bow. The ship participated in the annual manoeuvres in August 1889 and a shell exploded in one of her 12.5-inch gun barrels on 2 September, wounding one man. The ship was reduced to reserve at Chatham Dockyard in 1891. Her BL six-inch, 80-pounder guns were replaced by QF six-inch guns in 1897. She was further reduced to Dockyard Reserve in November 1901, and was sold to Castles for scrap in March 1904 and subsequently broken up at Charlton.

Notes

References

External links
 

 

Ajax-class ironclads
Victorian-era battleships of the United Kingdom
1880 ships